The Asian-American influx to the San Gabriel Valley grew rapidly when Chinese began settling in Monterey Park, California in the western San Gabriel Valley in the 1970s. Just east of Los Angeles, the region has achieved international prominence as a hub of overseas Chinese, or hua qiao. Although Chinese immigrants were a noteworthy presence in the establishment of Southern California from the 19th century, significant Chinese migration to suburban San Gabriel Valley coincided with a trend of white out-migration from the 1970s onward. This opened an opportunity for middle-class Asian Americans to begin settling in the San Gabriel Valley.

High property values, crime, and overcrowding in Monterey Park have contributed to a secondary movement away from that city, and the Chinese community is now spread over a cluster of cities in the San Gabriel Valley. Suburban cities in the valley besides Monterey Park with large Chinese populations, also called ethnoburbs, include Alhambra, Arcadia, Rosemead, San Marino, San Gabriel, South Pasadena, and Temple City and then eastward to Chino Hills, Diamond Bar, the City of Industry, Hacienda Heights, Rowland Heights, Walnut, and West Covina. Numerous Mandarin, Hokkien, Taiwanese, Teochew, and Cantonese speaking businesses have been established in these suburbs to accommodate the changing population.

History
The history of the San Gabriel Valley, like much of the American West, included Chinese, Japanese, Filipino, and south Asian settlers and pioneers in the mid-19th century. These Asian settlers worked the fields of grapes, citrus fruits, and other crops. They were also involved in the construction of early infrastructure for San Gabriel Valley. Due to the 1882 Chinese Exclusion Act, the 1942 internment of Japanese, and racial covenant laws, Asian economic and social assimilation were halted for many years. The only Asian cultural hubs were Chinatown and Little Tokyo in Downtown Los Angeles, though populations persisted elsewhere.

In 1961, Alfred Song became the first Asian American elected to the California State Assembly, representing Monterey Park. Since the passage of the 1965 Immigration Act, there has been an influx of some 20 million Asian immigrants to the United States, many of whom settled in Monterey Park due to its close proximity to Chinatown, suburban appeal, and "superior public education" to LAUSD. This continued through the 1970s with the arrival of ethnic Chinese refugees from Vietnam, affluent waisheng ren Taiwanese, and Mainland Chinese.

While these San Gabriel neighborhoods contain prominent Chinese-language signage, these communities do not feature the Chinese-style gateways, or paifang, found in the original Chinatown. In 1988, Monterey Park passed an ordinance declaring a moratorium on new building, in an attempt to regulate the rapid growth the city experienced as a result of the influx of Asian immigrants. This moratorium was challenged and defeated in 1989, but it caused many Asian residents and businesses to move to the neighboring city of Alhambra, later spreading to easterly to more communities.

By 1996, the population of Monterey Park was 65% Asian, primarily Chinese. Given the San Gabriel Valley's rapidly increasing population of Asian-Americans (largely Chinese-Americans), several business districts were developed to serve their needs. By 2000, many Chinatown residents and businesses had moved to the San Gabriel Valley.
The creation of this major hub, which is a cultural center with many suburban cities, is an "Asian Pacific American phenomenon". Rather than solely being a significant Chinese American cultural center, the area is a hub of much more extensive "multigenerational and multiethnic Asian American diversity." In the 21st century, many of the ethnoburbs in the San Gabriel Valley have expanded and thrived, and are becoming increasingly diverse - as well as congested.

2023 Monterey Park mass shooting

Communities

There are several suburban Chinese-oriented ethnoburbs in Southern California, including those in the San Gabriel Valley. Unlike the official Chinatown in downtown Los Angeles, these "pocket" communities are not called "Chinatown" by the Chinese community there, but generally by the name of the city. Monterey Park has been called the "First Suburban Chinatown" due to it not being located in the downtown of a large city.

The Asian communities in the San Gabriel Valley follow along a  stretch of Valley Boulevard, covering the entire length of the valley with Alhambra on the west side and Diamond Bar on the east side. Asian communities in the valley extend as far north as San Marino and Arcadia and as far south as Hacienda Heights and Rowland Heights.

San Gabriel has become a brand-name destination for Chinese tourists, especially in the business district around the San Gabriel Mall. This tourism boom is bringing about the construction of additional hotels as many Chinese tourists prefer to rent rooms in San Gabriel, even if they plan to visit typical Southern California tourist destinations.

The first generation of Chinese Americans in the area identify with 626 — the area code of much of the San Gabriel Valley. They are fluent in English but still identify with the culture of their parents. Many feel that something new has been created, such as songs mixing bits of dialect from across China with American hip-hop. The popularity of Boba, chewy tapioca pearls served in a drink of sweet tea, is a cultural touchstone of "626." Popular food festival 626 Night Market in Arcadia, California was also named after the area code as a "mecca for the Chinese food-obsessed."

Monterey Park
From the 1970s on, Taiwanese immigrants began settling in Monterey Park and the nearby communities of Alhambra, and Rosemead. The area was not too far from the Los Angeles Chinatown commercial area and was becoming a Chinese influenced community. This trend included affluent Chinese professionals, mostly from Taiwan. At that time, Monterey Park was being marketed by realtors in Taiwan and Hong Kong as the "Chinese Beverly Hills," to entice future investors. The crowded downtown L.A. Chinatown did not have room for the growing numbers of Chinese leaving Taiwan and Hong Kong for economic opportunities in America. Other Mandarin Chinese-speaking immigrants, of the middle and working classes, from Taiwan and Mainland China later followed. Settlement in the city picked up the pace in the 1980s following opportunities created by the white flight from the San Gabriel Valley. Chinese shopping centers—with supermarkets serving as anchors—were developed to serve the new residents. As this unique phenomenon became known, Monterey Park was described as the "first suburban Chinatown" in North America, and was featured in Forbes magazine, Time magazine, Los Angeles Times, and The Atlantic Monthly. Monterey Park's effect on tourism in Los Angeles was featured on the "Life and Times" show on the L.A. former-PBS affiliate KCET.

Little Taipei (Chinese: 小臺北) was an informal name given to the city of Monterey Park, California in the late 1970s because of the large immigrant population from Taiwan. (Taipei is the capital city of Taiwan.) The city council had tried and failed to pass English-only sign ordinances, because of safety issues for police and fire departments. In 1985 the City Council of Monterey Park approved drafting of a proposal that would require all businesses in Monterey Park to display English language identification on business signs. According to the Monterey Park Chamber of Commerce, within the city's  limits, there are more than 60 Chinese restaurants, more than 50 realty companies, several Chinese supermarkets, scores of dental, medical, accounting and legal offices, and dozens of shopping centers.

The Chinese American population in Monterey Park and San Gabriel Valley is relatively diverse in socioeconomics and region of origin, including overseas Chinese from Vietnam and Indonesia. In Monterey Park, 61.3 percent of the population is Asian American, In Alhambra, Arcadia, and San Gabriel, the Asian population is 48.91 percent, as of the 2000 census. Montebello is also included as it has had a significant (almost 25%) Asian population for several decades after seceding from Monterey Park.

San Gabriel

The city of San Gabriel boasts a mixture of Asian, European, and North American cultures. Second- and third-generation Chinese Americans patronize its diverse array of stores and eateries. There is the  "San Gabriel Square" mall that has been mentioned in the Los Angeles Times as "the great mall of China." This stretch of Chinese shops and bold architecture, with roofs of Spanish-style tile, is the model for the new ethnoburbs recently recognized in areas like the Las Vegas Valley and Houston. The conglomeration of restaurants and cafes, shops, markets, hair and nail salons, Asian video stores, health services, department stores, plus an extensive jewelry mart, provides 'something for everyone', from purchasing an expensive diamond and shopping for designer suits, to buying soy milk or a travel package to Las Vegas or China.

Alhambra

In 1992, the city of Alhambra and its southern neighbor Monterey Park jointly held the first annual Chinese new year parade and street festival. There were several conflicts and controversies with Monterey Park, so in the next few years the city of Alhambra has held the parade with its neighbor San Gabriel. The parade and festival have corporate sponsors, and several Chinese-dominant cities in San Gabriel Valley also sponsor the parade. This parade is broadcast on LA Chinese-language radio and on TV. Chi Mui became the city's first Chinese American mayor in 2006. The new San Gabriel Chinese aggregation served as the setting for the thriller novel The Jasmine Trade, authored by Denise Hamilton.

Rowland Heights 
Chinese businesses were formerly more spread out in Rowland Heights, an unincorporated area with a Chinese retail corridor on Colima Road and Nogales Street and intermixed with a Korean community. Taiwanese and Mainland Chinese, with number of ethnic Chinese from South Korea, and Vietnam, immigrant businesses, namely the eateries, banks, and offices, are gradually occupying the various strip malls across the Puente Hills Mall and in Hacienda Heights and City of Industry. The population is now 55 percent Asian.

Rowland Heights remains the Chinese commercial/cultural center in East San Gabriel.

Hacienda Heights
Nearby in Hacienda Heights, Hsi Lai Temple, a Buddhist temple, was built in 1988. Though the proposed development was opposed at the time by some local residents, it is now a respected and accepted part of the community, with members of the United States House of Representatives and the Los Angeles County Sheriff's Department often visiting during major events. The Hsi Lai Temple is the largest Buddhist temple in the Western Hemisphere.

In addition to Rowland Heights and Hacienda Heights, Eastern San Gabriel Valley areas with a high percentage of Asian residents are West Covina, Walnut, and Diamond Bar.

Temple City
As of the 2000 census, the racial makeup of Temple City was 38.89% Asian, that number is expected to be significantly higher in 2010 census. Along Las Tunas Boulevard, the "Bridal District" of Asian businesses along the stretch of the downtown area has made Temple City a bride's "mecca" for all wedding needs including elaborate dresses, as Asian brides often wear three gowns. Also included are several florists and lavish portrait studios supporting the Asian tradition of taking studio quality photos of the bride and groom before the wedding. Asian brides come from as far away as New York City to visit this Temple City specialty sector.

Valley Boulevard Corridor

L.A. County

Asian-American ethnoburbs can be found in the South Bay, Los Angeles and San Fernando Valley, and may include South Asians. These include are Sawtelle (West Los Angeles), San Pedro (due to its proximity to the Port of Los Angeles/Long Beach) and Pasadena, though Pasadena's historic Japantowns are no longer hubs of the Japanese American communities. The towns of Artesia, Cerritos, Gardena, Hawaiian Gardens, La Mirada, Lakewood, Long Beach, Carson, Lomita, Norwalk, Redondo Beach, Torrance and Whittier have some Asian-American neighborhoods and businesses/malls.

Similar enclaves outside L.A. County 
Experts said they predict more Asian-oriented supermarkets of these types to open in other Inland cities in coming years, including Corona, California, whose Asian population jumped from 8 percent to 11 percent from 2000 to 2005. Also for Rancho Cucamonga, whose Asian population rose from 6 percent in 2000 to 8 percent in 2005.

Other Asian ethnoburbs in Southern California are in Orange County such as Anaheim, Buena Park, Costa Mesa, Garden Grove, Huntington Beach, Irvine, Laguna Beach, Laguna Niguel, La Palma, Orange and Westminster.

Chinese and Asian-American ethnoburbs also can be found in Chino, Chino Hills, San Bernardino, Calico, a section of Barstow, Fontana, Riverside, Moreno Valley, San Jacinto, Desert Hot Springs north of Palm Springs, Victorville, Loma Linda and elsewhere (I.e. the San Diego area, Bakersfield and San Luis Obispo).

Outside the Greater Los Angeles Area, Chinese ethnoburbs are also found in the San Francisco Bay Area, where ethnic Chinese populations are largely concentrated in cities of the East Bay and Santa Clara County. The most prominent Chinese ethnoburb in the region is found in the city of Milpitas, which has a population that is over 60% Asian as of the 2010 U.S. Census. Chinese-oriented shopping centers, markets, and community centers are spread around the city. Other suburbs which have large Chinese populations and commercial activity include Fremont, Cupertino, San Leandro and Sunnyvale, with the former two having majority Asian American populations and the latter two with plurality Asian American populations as of the 2010 U.S. Census.

Population
List of cities and CDP with Chinese American (Including Taiwanese American) population, according to the 2011-2015 American Community Survey and the 2010 United States Census.

See also
 History of Chinese Americans
 History of the Chinese Americans in Los Angeles
 List of U.S. cities with significant Chinese-American populations
 Little Saigon#San Gabriel Valley

References

Further reading
 Timothy P. Fong, The First Suburban Chinatown: The Remaking of Monterey Park (Temple University Press) 

Chinatowns
San Gabriel Valley
Chinese-American culture in California
San Gabriel Valley
Chinese-American history
Chinatowns
Chinatowns
Chinatowns in California